Kalmah is a Finnish melodic death metal band from Pudasjärvi that formed in 1998. In less than a year after its formation, Kalmah was signed by Spinefarm Records.  The word "kalmah" is Karelian and could be translated as "to the grave" or "to the death".

History

In 1991, Pekka Kokko and Petri Sankala founded the metal band Ancestor. After Ancestor had recorded two demos, Antti Kokko joined the band as lead guitarist. In 1998, after five demos, Ancestor disbanded and Kalmah formed. The new band consisted of Pekka Kokko performing vocals and guitar, Antti Kokko on lead guitar, Pasi Hiltula on keyboards, Altti Veteläinen on bass, and Petri Sankala on drums.

Kalmah began to write songs for a promotional CD entitled Svieri Obraza. With this demo, they acquired a recording contract with Spinefarm Records and headed to Tico-Tico Studios to record their debut album, Swamplord which was released in 2000.

By November 2001, they returned to Tico-Tico Studios to record their second studio album, They Will Return.  By this time, Veteläinen and Sankala were replaced by Timo Lehtinen on bass and Janne Kusmin on drums, respectively.  In 2002, Kalmah played shows in Finland and at Wacken Open Air. In February 2003, they recorded their third studio album, Swampsong. In 2004, keyboardist Pasi Hiltula left and was replaced by Marco Sneck. The band released The Black Waltz in 2006 and For the Revolution in 2008.  Kalmah toured in Canada and Finland to promote the latter album.

12 Gauge

Kalmah's sixth studio album was released in Japan on 24 February 2010, Canada on 2 March, Europe on 3 March and North America on 6 April.

Recording and mixing took place from May to August at Tico-Tico Studios in Finland, and mastering for the disc took place at the Cutting Room in Sweden.

The track "Bullets Are Blind" was released in December 2009 on a 2-CD collection included with the 35th anniversary issue of Soundi magazine.

In March 2010, 12 Gauge became the first Kalmah album to be released on vinyl.  The album was mastered for vinyl by Joona Lukala, Noise for Fiction, and released by Svart Records in a limited run of 500 copies.

Seventh Swamphony

In 2012, Kalmah finished filming a new music video for their upcoming album, due to be released in 2013. The band have kept fans up to date with their process via social networking website Facebook by uploading different photos, as well as a short behind the scenes video from the day of filming their video. They also announced that they currently have 6 songs finished, and they plan to enter the studio in January 2013.

The artwork for their seventh studio album will be created by artist Juha Vuorma, the man also behind the art of Kalmah's first 3 albums.

In April 2013, it was announced that the band will release their seventh studio album, Seventh Swamphony, on 17 June.

Palo
Kalmah's eighth album, Palo, was released on April 6, 2018. A single from the album, "Evil Kin" was released on February 9, 2018.

Musical style 
The band's musical style is primarily classified as melodic death metal with their sound including strong influences of power metal, thrash metal and black metal. Musically, the band has been compared to fellow Finnish metal acts Children of Bodom, Norther and Wintersun.

Discography 

Studio albums
 Swamplord (2000)
 They Will Return (2002)
 Swampsong (2003)
 The Black Waltz (2006)
 For the Revolution (2008)
 12 Gauge (2010)
 Seventh Swamphony (2013)
 Palo (2018)

Demos and EPs
As Ancestor
 Ethereal Devotion (1992)
 Material World God (1993)
 With No Strings Attached (1995)
 Tomorrow (1997)
 Under the Burbot's Nest (1998)
As Kalmah
 Svieri Obraza (1999) − promo
 Demo 2004 (2004)

Videos
 Withering Away (2000)
 The Groan of Wind (2006)
  12 Gauge studio diary in seven parts (2009)
 12 Gauge (2010) (music video)
 Seventh Swamphony (2013)
 Evil Kin (2018)
 Blood Ran Cold (2018)
 Take Me Away (2018)

Band members 

Current members
 Pekka Kokko – rhythm guitar, vocals (1998–present)
 Antti Kokko – lead guitar (1998–present)
 Timo Lehtinen – bass (2001–present)
 Janne Kusmin – drums (2001–present)
 Veli-Matti Kananen – keyboards (2012–present)

Former members
 Altti Veteläinen – bass guitar (1998–2001)
 Petri Sankala – drums (1998–2001)
 Antti-Matti Talala – keyboards (1999)
 Pasi Hiltula – keyboards (1999–2004)
 Marco Sneck – keyboards(2004–2011)

Timeline

References

External links 
 
 

Finnish melodic death metal musical groups
Musical groups established in 1999
Musical quintets
1999 establishments in Finland